Parintins Folklore Festival (Festival Folclórico de Parintins), or often also called Festival do Boi-Bumbá, Bumba Meu Boi, or simply Festival, is a popular annual celebration during three days in late June held in the Brazilian city of Parintins, Amazonas. It is one of the largest annual festivals in Brazil; only the Carnival festivities in Rio de Janeiro and Salvador draw more participants. The festival is recognized as a Cultural Heritage of Brazil by the National Institute of Historic and Artistic Heritage.

The festival celebrates a local legend about a resurrected ox. It is also a competition where two teams, Garantido and Caprichoso, compete in extended retellings of the story, each team attempting to outdo the other with flamboyant dances, singing, and parade floats. Each team has to complete its show within two and a half hours. A team that does not follow this time limit is subjected to points penalties. Each nightly performance is largely based on local Amazonian folklore and indigenous culture, but also incorporates contemporary Brazilian rhythms and themes.
The place where the teams present themselves is called "Bumbódromo", a round, grounded stage. The "Bumbódromo" supports 35.000 people in the audience.

Despite the importance of the celebration to the Amazonas region of Brazil, this festival was not widely known in other parts of the country until the musical group Carrapicho released the hit Tic Tic Tac - Bate forte o tambor in 1996. The Parintins Folklore Festival was also responsible for the release of other songs that became known in Brazil, such as Vermelho and Parintins Para o Mundo Ver, among others.

It is common for local people to tell the visitors that Parintins is the only place in the World where Coca-Cola ads are blue. While it is true that within the Bumbódromo there are Coca-Cola ads in both red and blue, there are other instances of Coca-Cola ads reflecting the colors of sporting teams. During the 2011 Festival do Boi-Bumbá, Coca-Cola was available throughout Amazonas region in special edition cans that were half red, half blue.

Gallery of images

See also
 Festa Junina
 Bumba Meu Boi

External links
 Official Festival Website
  Boi Bumba Festival
  BUMBA-MEU-BOI
 Tic Tic Tac - Beats strong the drum (Parintins Festival Music) YouTube Link
 Red (Parintins Festival Music) YouTube Link
 Parintins for the world to see (Parintins Festival Music) YouTube Link
 The color of my country (Parintins Festival Music) YouTube Link

References

Tourist attractions in Amazonas (Brazilian state)
Brazilian folklore
Parades in Brazil
Folk festivals in Brazil

nl:Parintins (gemeente)#De boi-bumbá